IFSA can refer to the following:

 International Federation of Strength Athletes
 International Forestry Students' Association
 International Free Skiers Association